Siege of Jaén may refer to:
 Siege of Jaén (1225)
 Siege of Jaén (1230)
 Siege of Jaén (1245–46)

See also
 Jaén (disambiguation)